The lead-up to the Iraq War (i.e., the 2003 invasion of Iraq and subsequent hostilities) began with United Nations Security Council Resolution 687 and subsequent UN weapons inspectors inside Iraq. This period also saw low-level hostilities between Iraq and the United States-led coalition from 1991–2003.

In the aftermath of the Gulf War, the dominant U.S. foreign policy view towards Iraq was one of containment. However, during the 1990s, the view, most prominently advocated by neoconservatives, that the threat of Saddam Hussein's regime could only be addressed through regime change and democratization became more salient. After the 9/11 attacks, a foreign policy consensus formed in favor of regime change.

1991–2000: UN inspectors, no-fly zones, and Iraqi opposition groups
Following the 1991 Gulf War, as part of the ceasefire agreement, the United Nations Security Council Resolution 687 mandated that Iraqi chemical, biological, nuclear, and long range missile programs be halted and all such weapons destroyed under United Nations Special Commission control. The UN weapons inspectors inside Iraq were able to verify the destruction of a large amount of WMD-material, but substantial issues remained unresolved in 1998 when the inspectors left Iraq due to then current UNSCOM head Richard Butler's belief that U.S. and UK military action was imminent. Shortly after the inspectors withdrew, the U.S. and UK launched a four-day bombing campaign in Iraq. Also, during this period the U.S. Congress and U.S. President Bill Clinton issued a resolution calling for regime change in Iraq.    
   
In addition to the UN inspections, the U.S. and UK (along with France until 1998) engaged in a low-level conflict with Iraq by enforcing non-UN mandated northern and southern Iraqi no-fly zones. These were known as Operation Provide Comfort and Operation Provide Comfort II then followed by Operation Northern Watch in Iraqi Kurdistan in the north and Operation Southern Watch in the south, and were seen by the Iraqi government as an infringement of Iraq's sovereignty. These overflights intensified one year before the Iraq war began when the U.S. initiated Operation Southern Focus in order to disrupt the military command structure in Iraq before the invasion.

Iraqi expatriate opposition groups
Following the 1991 Gulf War, U.S. President George H. W. Bush signed a presidential finding directing the Central Intelligence Agency to create conditions for Hussein's removal from power in May 1991. Coordinating anti-Saddam groups was an important element of this strategy and the Iraqi National Congress (INC), led by Ahmed Chalabi, was the main group tasked with this purpose. The name INC was reportedly coined by public relations expert John Rendon (of the Rendon Group agency) and the group received millions in covert funding in the 1990s, and then about $8 million a year in overt funding after the passage of the Iraq Liberation Act in 1998. Another opposition group was the Iraqi National Accord which continues to have influence in the current Iraqi government through its leader Ayad Allawi.

Presidential involvement
In late April 1993, the United States asserted that Saddam Hussein had attempted to have former President George H. W. Bush assassinated during a visit to Kuwait on April 14–16. On June 26, as per order of then-President Clinton, U.S. warships stationed in the Persian Gulf and the Red Sea launched a cruise missile attack at the Iraqi Intelligence Service building in downtown Baghdad in response to Iraq's plot to assassinate former President George H. W. Bush. Clinton briefed President-elect George W. Bush in December 2000, expressing his regret that people he regarded as the world's two most dangerous individuals, including Hussein, were still alive and free. He warned Bush that Hussein will "cause you a world of problems."

Bush's Treasury Secretary Paul O'Neill said that Bush's first two National Security Council meetings included a discussion of invading Iraq. He was given briefing materials entitled "Plan for post-Saddam Iraq," which envisioned peacekeeping troops, war crimes tribunals, and divvying up Iraq's oil wealth. A Pentagon document dated March 5, 2001 was titled "Foreign Suitors for Iraqi Oilfield contracts," and included a map of potential areas for exploration.

In April 2002, Colin Powell wrote Bush to inform him that Tony Blair was ready to support the invasion of Iraq, and would present further advice regarding "strategic, tactical, and public affairs lines" during Blair's forthcoming visit to Crawford.

CIA SAD teams

The CIA's Special Activities Division (SAD) teams were the first U.S. forces to enter Iraq in July 2002, prior to the U.S. Invasion. Once on the ground, they prepared for the subsequent arrival of U.S. Army Special Forces to organize the Kurdish Peshmerga. This joint team (called the Northern Iraq Liaison Element (NILE))  combined to defeat Ansar al-Islam, an ally of Al Qaeda, in the North East corner of Iraq. This battle was for control of a territory that was occupied by Ansar al-Islam and was executed prior to the invasion. It was carried out by Paramilitary Operations Officers from SAD and the Army's 10th Special Forces Group. This battle was a significant defeat of a key terrorist organization and the uncovering of a chemical weapons facility at Sargat. Sargat was the only facility of its type discovered in the Iraq war.

SAD teams also conducted missions behind enemy lines to identify leadership targets.  These missions led to the initial strikes against Saddam Hussein and his Generals. Although the strike against Saddam was unsuccessful in killing him, it was successful in effectively ending his ability to command and control his forces. Other strikes against his Generals were successful and significantly degraded the command's ability to react to, and maneuver against the U.S. led invasion force. SAD operations officers were also successful in convincing key Iraqi Army officers into surrendering their units once the fighting started.

Turkey refused to allow the U.S. Army entry into Northern Iraq. Therefore, joint SAD and Army Special forces teams and the Kurdish Peshmerga were the entire Northern force against Saddam. They managed to keep Saddam's Army in place rather than moving the northern army to contest the U.S. led coalition force coming from the south. The efforts of the Kurds, SAD and 10th Special Forces Group with the Kurds likely saved the lives of many US and coalition forces during and after the invasion.  As described by Mike Tucker and Charles Faddis in their book entitled, "Operation Hotel California: The Clandestine War Inside Iraq", four of these CIA officers were awarded the Intelligence Star for their heroic actions.

Congressional assessment of the need for war

Senator Bob Graham chaired the Senate Select Committee on Intelligence in 2002, when the Congress voted on the Iraq War Resolution.  He first became aware of the significance of Iraq in February 2002, when Gen. Tommy Franks told him the Bush administration had made the decision to begin to de-emphasize Afghanistan in order to get ready for Iraq. In September, the Senate Intelligence Committee met with George Tenet, Director of the CIA, and Graham requested a National Intelligence Estimate (NIE) on Iraq.  Tenet responded by saying "We've never done a National Intelligence Estimate on Iraq, including its weapons of mass destruction." and resisted the request to provide one to Congress. Graham insisted "This is the most important decision that we as members of Congress and that the people of America are likely to make in the foreseeable future. We want to have the best understanding of what it is we're about to get involved with." Tenet refused to do a report on the military or occupation phase, but reluctantly agreed to do a NIE on the weapons of mass destruction.  Graham described the Senate Intelligence Committee meeting with Tenet as "the turning point in our attitude towards Tenet and our understanding of how the intelligence community has become so submissive to the desires of the administration. The administration wasn't using intelligence to inform their judgment; they were using intelligence as part of a public relations campaign to justify their judgment."

Congress voted to support the war based on the NIE Tenet provided in October 2002. However, the bipartisan "Senate Intelligence Committee Report on Prewar Intelligence" released on July 7, 2004, concluded that the key findings in the 2002 NIE either overstated, or were not supported by, the actual intelligence.  The Senate report also found the US Intelligence Community to suffer from a "broken corporate culture and poor management" that resulted in a NIE that was completely wrong in almost every respect.

See also
Oil-for-Food Programme
Operation Northern Watch
Iraqi aluminum tubes

References

Modern history of Iraq
Occupation of Iraq
Politics of Iraq
Iraq–United States relations